Rajagopal Shunmugasundaram  is the Advocate General of Tamil Nadu. He was a Member of the Parliament of India for the Dravida Munnetra Kazhagam party representing Tamil Nadu in the Rajya Sabha, the upper house of the Indian Parliament. He also has experience as a public prosecutor when he worked from 1996-2001 as the Public Prosecutor of Tamil Nadu. He was attacked on  May 30, 1995 when he was going to file a corruption case against Jayalalitha."Welding" Kumar and 6 others were convicted for the attack.

References

Rajya Sabha members from Tamil Nadu
Dravida Munnetra Kazhagam politicians
Living people
1957 births